Los Chicos No Lloran (English: Boys Don't Cry) is the 10th studio album by Spanish musician and actor, Miguel Bosé, and his third with Warner Bros. Records (Warner Music Latina, in the U.S.). It was released in March 1990.

Track listing

1990 albums
Miguel Bosé albums